Lee Yong-yi (born July 30, 1958) is a theater, television and movie actress. She is known for her role as Nomo both in theater play and film Welcome to Dongmakgol (2005) and Netflix Series Hometown Cha-Cha-Cha (2021).

Career 
After graduated from Seoul Institute of the Arts, in 1979, Lee joined Theatre Company Minye where She debuted as an actress in the play Broken Jar by Heinrich von Kleist.

In 1986, Lee joined Theater Company Michu, where Lee took part in its many notable works. One of Lee notable performance was her role as Hyeong-bang in Madangnori Chunhyangjeon (1987-1992). She also performed in play Dung Dung Nakrang Dung (둥둥 낙랑둥) as King Bang Sook in July 12-24, 1996, at Towol Theater, Seoul Arts Center.

In 1991, Lee Yong-yi acted in Park Kwang-soo movie I Want to Go to That Island. She cast as Ne Eop-sun, a shaman who lived in the island with her husband. The actor cast as shaman husband was her real husband actor Kim Il-woo. The movie was released in 1993, So the year officially became her first big screen debut.

In 1995 Lee Yong-yi cast as Gwibone in play That Woman's Novel, by playwright Um In-hee. It’s an adaptation of novel Little Grandmother! and it is a refinement of a work published in 1989 by the writer Um In-hee in Another Cultural 3rd Collection. The play directed by Kang Young-geol and performed in the 19th Seoul Theater Festival in 1995 at the Arts Center Small Theater in June 1995. Lee Yong-yi won 19th Seoul Theater Festival Female Acting Award for this role.

In 1998, Lee became leader of the theater company Hyun Bin (玄牝) which was established by her husband, actor and theater director Kim Il-woo. Its first work was adaptation of Lee Moon-yeol's original novel 'Choice'. 

Since 2017, Lee Yong-yi signed an exclusive contract with Liyan Entertainment. Later She moved to High Entertainment.

Other activities 
Lee is also good at music. She studied Gyeonggi folk songs from the master pansori singer Ahn Bok-sik (1926–97). She was also lecturer on music and acting at Sungkyunkwan University Social Education Center.

Personal life 
Lee Yong-yi's husband was the late Kim Il-woo an actor and theater director. She met her husband in college, He was her senior in the theater department at Seoul Institute of the Arts. They have two children together. He died of stomach cancer in 2004.

Lee Yong-yi's older brother, 
is also an actor. Lee Dae-geun appeared in 'The Third Republic' and 'The Fourth Republic'. Lee Dae-geun has not been active since 'Fermented Family'.

Filmography

Film

Television series

Stage

Troupe Hyunbin

Musical

Theater

National Theater

Theater work

Musical

Theater

-

Awards

Notes

References

External links 

 
 
  
 Lee Young-yi at PlayDB 
 Lee Young-yi at Daum Encyclopedia 
 Lee Young-yi at Daum Movie 
 Lee Young-yi at Naver 
 Lee Young-yi at Highent Entertaintment Official Website 

Living people
1958 births
21st-century South Korean actresses
South Korean film actresses
South Korean television actresses